Victor McGuire (born 17 March 1964 in Tuebrook, Liverpool) is an English actor perhaps best known for playing Jack Boswell in series 1–3, 5-7 of Carla Lane's Bread, Ron Wheatcroft in every series of Goodnight Sweetheart and its 2016 one-off episode, and Sean Hughes' neighbour Tony in Sean's Show ("the kind of guy you can ask to build you a shed").

McGuire appeared as Gary, one of the pair of thieves in Guy Ritchie's Lock, Stock and Two Smoking Barrels, and as Deputy Chief Constable Nadin in Mike Leigh's Peterloo.

He has also appeared in a number of TV programmes, including Dalziel and Pascoe, Casualty and 2point4 Children. He played the character of Amos Hart in the West End musical Chicago and was Lazar Wolf in the West End production of Fiddler on the Roof at the Savoy Theatre. He later reprised the role of Amos Hart in the theatrical production of Chicago, in the Cambridge Theatre, London. In 2012 he appeared in two episodes of historical drama World Without End as peasant Mark Webber.
In 2005 he appeared in "A Fresh Start" and "Miller's Tale" - the first and the third episodes of the fifteenth series of Heartbeat as Brian Parker.

From 2012 to 2017 he appeared as security guard Ian in the Sky1 sitcom Trollied. His last appearance was in the Christmas special episode in December 2017.

In February 2019 McGuire appeared in Coronation Street as a character called Big Garth. In May 2019 McGuire played Garanin in the Sky / HBO Mini-Series Chernobyl.

In 2020 he appeared as a policeman in an advertisement for Haribo Starmix. McGuire is a supporter of Everton F.C. In 2020 he starred in ITV sitcom Kate & Koji as a customer named Mr. Mulholland, a pessimistic hypochondriac. In March 2021 he appeared in a safety advertisement for Highways England having the song "Go Left" a parody version of Go West by The Pet Shop Boys sung to him by two flies on his windscreen.

In 2022, he reprised his role as Mr. Mulholland in series two of Kate & Koji.

Filmography

Film

Television

Video games

References

External links
 

1964 births
Living people
English male television actors
Male actors from Liverpool
People from Tuebrook